Chris Trout is a British songwriter, musician and music writer. He has instigated or played in several Sheffield, Leeds and Nottingham based bands, including Kilgore Trout,A.C.Temple (1986–1991), Spoonfed Hybrid, Team 10, Bear, Lazerboy, Coping Saw and Smokers Die Younger.

He is also notable for his music criticism, as a significant contributor to Yorkshire-based Ablaze! (fanzine) (1987-1993, 2015-), London-based music magazine The Lizard (1993-1995) and music website Drowned In Sound (2011-2012).

References

External links 
 Misterchristrout.com
 Discography

Living people
Year of birth missing (living people)
British indie rock musicians
Musicians from Sheffield
4AD artists